Glasgow Airport, also known as Glasgow International Airport, formerly Abbotsinch Airport, is an international airport in Scotland. In 2019, the airport handled 8.84 million passengers, an 8.4% annual decrease, making it the second-busiest in Scotland, after Edinburgh Airport, and the ninth-busiest airport in the United Kingdom.

The airport is owned and operated by AGS Airports which also owns and operates Aberdeen and Southampton airports. It was previously owned and operated by Heathrow Airport Holdings (formerly known as BAA). The airport's largest tenants are easyJet and Loganair. Other major airlines using Glasgow as a base include Jet2.com and TUI Airways.

Glasgow Airport was opened in 1966 and originally flights only operated to other places in the United Kingdom and Europe. Glasgow Airport began to offer flights to other places around the world, flights which previously used Glasgow Prestwick Airport, which was subsequently relegated as the city's secondary airport catering for Ryanair and freight operators.

History
The history of the present Glasgow Airport goes back to 1932, when the site at Abbotsinch, between the Black Cart Water and the White Cart Water, near Paisley in Renfrewshire, was opened. In 1933 the Royal Air Force 602 Squadron (City of Glasgow) Auxiliary Air Force moved its Westland Wapiti IIA aircraft from nearby Renfrew. The RAF Station HQ, however, was not formed until 1 July 1936 when 6 Auxiliary Group, Bomber Command, arrived. From May 1939, until moving away in October 1939, the Squadron flew the Supermarine Spitfire.

1940
In 1940, a torpedo training unit was formed, which trained both RAF and Royal Navy crews under RAF Coastal Command. On 11 August 1943 Abbotsinch was handed over solely to the Royal Navy and it became a naval base. All navy ships and bases are given ship names and Abbotsinch's was known as HMS Sanderling since June 1940. During the 1950s, the airfield housed a large aircraft storage unit and squadrons of the Royal Naval Volunteer Reserve.

The Royal Navy left in October 1963. The name Sanderling was, however, retained as a link between the two: HMS Sanderlings ship's bell was presented to the new airport and a bar in the airport was named The Sanderling Bar.

The following squadrons were based at Glasgow Airport at some point:

Units

1960s
In the 1960s, Glasgow Corporation decided that a new airport for the city was required. The original Art Deco terminal building of the original airport has not survived. The site is now occupied by a Tesco supermarket and the M8 motorway; this straight and level section of motorway occupies the site of the runway.

Abbotsinch took over from Renfrew Airport on 2 May 1966. The UK Government had already committed millions into rebuilding Glasgow Prestwick Airport fit for the "jet age". Nevertheless, the plan went forward and the new airport, designed by Basil Spence and built at a cost of £4.2 million, it was completed in 1966, with British European Airways beginning services using De Havilland Comet aircraft.

The first commercial flight to arrive was a British European Airways flight from Edinburgh, landing at 8 am on 2 May 1966. The airport was officially opened on 27 June 1966 by Queen Elizabeth II. The political rows over Glasgow and Prestwick airports continued, with Prestwick enjoying a monopoly over transatlantic traffic (under the 1946 US-UK bilateral air transport agreement known as the Bermuda Agreement), while Glasgow Airport was only allowed to handle UK and intra-European traffic.

1970s to 1990s

In 1975, the BAA took ownership of Glasgow Airport. When BAA was privatised in the late 1980s, as BAA plc, it consolidated its airport portfolio and sold Prestwick Airport. BAA embarked on a massive redevelopment plan for Glasgow International Airport in 1989.

In the early 1990s, Glasgow became the first UK airport, and one of the first in Europe (after Israel) to screen all baggage. Until this time, only 'high risk' flights had their hand luggage and hold luggage checked. This was a result of the bombing of Pan Am flight 103 on the 21st December 1988 over the Scottish town of Lockerbie.

An extended terminal building was created by building a pre-fabricated metal structure around the front of the original Basil Spence building, hence screening much of its distinctive Brutalist style architecture from view, with the void between the two structures joined by a glass atrium and walkway. Spence's original concrete facade which once looked onto Caledonia Road now fronts the check-in desks. The original building can be seen more clearly from the rear, with the mock barrel-vaulted roof visible when airside.

A dedicated international departure lounge and pier was added at the western side of the building, leaving the facility with a total of 38 gates, bringing its capacity up to nine million passengers per year. In 2003, BAA completed redevelopment work on a satellite building (called "T2", formerly the St. Andrews Building), to provide a dedicated check-in facility for low-cost airlines, principally Aer Lingus, Virgin Atlantic and Thomas Cook Airlines until they went into administration.

By 1996, Glasgow was handling over 5.5 million passengers per annum, making it the fourth-largest airport in the UK.

Post 2000

The airport serves a variety of destinations throughout Canada, Europe and the Middle East. easyJet, Jet2.com, Loganair and TUI Airways are all based at the airport.

The terminal consists of three piers; the West Pier, Central Pier and East Pier.

The West Pier, commonly known as the International Pier, was built as part of the 1989 extension project and is the principal international and long haul departure point. All but two of the stands on this pier are equipped with airbridges. This pier has stands 27 - 36. In 2019, the pier received the ability to facilitate the A380 following an £8million upgrade.

The Central Pier was part of the original 1966 building. The British Airways gates are located in the 1971 extension at the end of the pier, with Heathrow and Gatwick shuttles making up most of its traffic as well as BA CityFlyer flights to London City. The British Airways lounge is located on this pier, across from gate 15. Aer Lingus and Flybe formerly operated from the centre pier. Most of the stands on this pier are equipped with airbridges. This pier has stands 14 - 26.

The East Pier, constructed in the mid-1970s, was originally used for international flights but in recent years has been re-developed for use by low-cost airlines. None of the stands on this pier are equipped with airbridges. The main users of this pier are easyJet, Jet2.com, Loganair and Ryanair. In 2015, a £3million extension was added to the pier, creating space for 750,000 extra passengers a year. This pier has stands 112.

In late 2007, work commenced on Skyhub (located between Terminal 1 and Terminal 2) which created a single, purpose-built security screening area in place of the previous individual facilities for each of the three piers, the other side effect being an enlarged duty-free shopping area created by taking most of the previous landside shopping and restaurant facilities airside. This new arrangement also frees up space in the departure lounges through the removal of the separate duty-free shops in the West and Central Piers. This however meant that the former public viewing areas of the apron are now airside, making the airport inaccessible to aviation enthusiasts and spectators.

Future growth is hampered by the airport's location, which is constrained by the M8 motorway to the south, the town of Renfrew to the east and the River Clyde to the north. At present the areas of Drumchapel, Clydebank, Bearsden, Foxbar, Faifley and Linwood all sit directly underneath the approach paths into the airport, meaning that further increases in traffic may be politically sensitive. The airport is challenged by Edinburgh Airport, which now serves a wider range of European destinations and has grown to overtake Glasgow as Scotland's busiest airport.

The Scottish Executive announced in 2002 that a rail line – known as the Glasgow Airport Rail Link (GARL) – would be built from Glasgow Central station to Glasgow Airport. The rail link was to be completed by 2012 with the first trains running early in 2013. In 2009, however, it was announced by the Scottish Government that the plan had been cancelled.

Currently, the airport is easily accessible by road due with direct access to the adjoining M8 motorway. It is also served by a frequent bus service, the Glasgow Airport Express, which operates services to city centre. The service is run by First Glasgow and all buses feature leather seats, USB charging ports and free WiFi.

The airport is home to the Scottish regional airline Loganair, previously a Flybe franchise operator, who have their head office located on site. British Airways has a maintenance hangar at the airport, capable of carrying out overhaul work on Airbus A320, as well as a cargo facility.

The Royal Air Force also has a unit based within the airport – The Universities of Glasgow and Strathclyde Air Squadron – to provide flying training to university students who plan to join the RAF.

In 2007, Glasgow became the second-busiest airport in Scotland as passenger numbers were surpassed by those at Edinburgh Airport.

On 30 June 2007, a day after the failed car bomb attacks in London, an attack at Glasgow International Airport occurred. A flaming Jeep Cherokee was driven into the entrance of Main Terminal. Two men, one alight, fled the vehicle before being apprehended by a combination of police officers, airport security officers and witnesses. One of the men died in the following months due to injuries sustained in the attack. New barriers and security measures have been added to prevent a similar incident from taking place.

Icelandair temporarily moved its base of operations from Keflavík International Airport to Glasgow due to the 2010 eruptions of Eyjafjallajökull.

On 10 April 2014, Emirates operated an Airbus A380 to Glasgow to celebrate the 10th anniversary of the Glasgow - Dubai route, and was the first time an A380 had visited a Scottish airport.

In July 2014, Emirates opened a dedicated lounge at the airport for First and Business class passengers. It is located at the top of the West Pier. In October 2014, Heathrow Airport Holdings reached an agreement to sell the airport, together with Southampton and Aberdeen, to a consortium of Ferrovial and Macquarie Group for £1 billion. 

In 2017, easyJet became the first airline to carry more than one million passengers from the airport in a period of 12 months.

On 27 February 2018, Ryanair announced that it would close its base at Glasgow, and retain just three of its 22 routes. It cited the Scottish Government's failure to replace Air Passenger Duty with a cheaper Air Departure Tax.

On 16 April 2019, Emirates launched a daily A380 flight on the Glasgow - Dubai route, making it the first regular A380 service in Scotland.

On 12 June 2021, Aer Lingus Regional operator Stobart Air entered liquidation resulting in all Aer Lingus routes to and from the airport being cancelled with immediate effect. Stobart Air was due to be replaced by Emerald Airlines as the Aer Lingus Regional operator in 2023, although their CEO states they would be able to launch flights from summer 2021 should they need to, bringing the possibility of the routes being restored in the future.

Plans
In 2005, BAA published a consultation paper for the development of the airport. The consultation paper included proposals for a second runway parallel to and to the north-west of the existing runway 05/23; redevelopment and enlargement of the East (low-cost) pier to connect directly with Terminal 2; and an additional International Pier to the west of the existing International Pier. There were plans for a new rail terminal, joined to the airport's passenger terminal and multi-storey car park. On 29 November 2006, the Scottish Parliament gave the go-ahead for the new railway station as part of the Glasgow Airport Rail Link to Glasgow Central station, originally due for completion in 2011. However, on 17 September 2009, due to escalating costs, the project was cancelled by the Scottish Government.

BAA's plans, which are expected to cost some £290 million over the next 25 years, come in response to a forecasted trebling of annual passenger numbers passing through the airport by 2030. The current figure of 9.4 million passengers passing through the airport is expected to rise to more than 24 million by 2030.

As of late 2017, there are plans to build a light rail link that will connect the city centre to the airport via Govan, with plans already underway to begin construction of the project after the cancellation of the original Glasgow Airport Rail Link project.

Airlines and destinations
The following airlines operate regular scheduled and charter services to and from Glasgow:

Glasgow airport investment area

Glasgow airport investment area is a £39.1million Glasgow city region city deal project to deliver the infrastructure and environmental improvements facilitating a world-class business and commercial location in the heart of Renfrewshire, connected by air, sea and land.

Statistics

Annual traffic data

Busiest routes

Accidents and incidents
 On 3 September 1999, a Cessna 404 carrying nine Airtours staff from Glasgow to Aberdeen on a transfer flight, crashed minutes after takeoff near the town of Linwood, Renfrewshire. Eight people were killed and three seriously injured. No one on the ground was hurt. The Air Accident Investigation Branch determined the aircraft had developed an engine malfunction during takeoff. Although the captain decided to return to the airfield, he mistakenly identified the working engine as the faulty one and shut it down, causing the aircraft to crash. A fatal accident inquiry was also held, which reached the same conclusion.
 On 30 June 2007, a group of extremists attacked the airport by ramming a Jeep Cherokee into the entrance of the main terminal which set the car on fire. There was some damage to the airport. One of the perpetrators died in the hospital and the others were jailed.
 In August 2019, two drunken United Airlines pilots tried to fly a plane but were stopped by local authorities. They were arrested for being drunk. The plane was to leave for New York City.

Ground transport

The airport is currently linked to Glasgow City Centre by the 500 Glasgow Airport Express service. This is run by First Glasgow under contract to Glasgow Airport. Started in 2011, the service runs direct via the M8 motorway. McGill's Bus Services service 757 links the airport with Paisley Gilmour Street railway station, Paisley town centre, Erskine & Clydebank. This bus accepts National Rail tickets between Glasgow Airport and any railway station.

Proposed rail link

Plans for a rail link from the airport to Glasgow Central station were proposed in the 2000s, shelved in 2009 and then resurrected  work is due to start in 2022, with the line expected to open in 2025.

Glasgow Metro

A planned extension of the Glasgow Subway system which is proposed to include multiple light rail and elevated rapid transit lines around the city including a line to Paisley City Centre, and two stations at Glasgow Airport. The line would be elevated at the airport and run on segregated tracks into Glasgow City Centre, and would most likely cancel the current plans for the Glasgow Airport Rail Link

Notes

References

Sources
 McCloskey, Keith. Glasgow's Airports: Renfrew and Abbotsinch. Stroud, Gloucestershire, UK: The History Press Ltd., 2009. .
 Smith, David J. Action Stations, Volume 7: Military airfields of Scotland, the North-East and Northern Ireland. Cambridge, Cambridgeshire, UK: Patrick Stephens Ltd., 1983 .

External links

 Official website

1966 establishments in Scotland
Airports established in 1932
Airports in Scotland
Basil Spence buildings
Buildings and structures in Renfrewshire
Heathrow Airport Holdings
Transport in Glasgow
Transport in Paisley, Renfrewshire